Waagenoceras is a genus of cephalopods first recorded in the early Permian Period. It has been described as a 'fast-moving nektonic carnivore' by the Paleobiology Database. They have been found in Canada, mainly in British Columbia, though the overwhelming majority have been found in Texas, United States and others in Mexico. Others have been found in China, Indonesia, Iraq, Italy, Japan, Oman, Russian Federation, and Tunisia.

Species
Waagenoceras dieneri
Waagenoceras mojsisovicsi
Waagenoceras nikitini
Waagenoceras obliquum
Waagenoceras richardsoni
Waagenoceras girtyi
Waagenoceras stachei

References

Goniatitida genera
Cyclolobaceae
Permian animals of North America
Paleozoic life of British Columbia